Oxycarenus lavaterae, common name lime seed bug, is a species of ground bug of the family Lygaeidae, subfamily Oxycareninae.

Distribution
Historically it was mainly found in the Mediterranean Basin, including North Africa, but beginning in the 1970s, it has been found further north, into the Benelux counties, Central Europe and Eastern Europe.

Description

Adult bugs are mostly red, white and black colored. The head, the entire prothorax, the scutellum and the antennae are black. The upper part of the abdomen is brick-red, while the connexivum is blackish. The front wings are colorless and transparent and reach the top of the abdomen or are a little longer. The nymphs can be easily recognized by their black head and the red-colored abdomen. The wing pads of the nymphs are completely black.

Biology
There are usually two annual generations. These bugs are found on and feed upon plants in the family Malvaceae, such as Lavatera (hence the species name), Althea, Hibiscus, and Malva. They are considered an invasive pest in some countries.

In warmer countries Oxycarenus lavaterae hibernates as adults. These bugs form large aggregates on trunks and branches of the trees to overwinter, typically on lime trees (Tilia)(Tilia americana, Tilia cordata, Tilia parviflora, Tilia platyphyllos), less frequently on  other plants (Populus, Platanus, Aesculus hippocastanum).

References

External links
 Biolib
 EOL

Lygaeidae